The 2019 National Premier Leagues Grand Final was the seventh National Premier Leagues Grand Final, the championship deciding match of the National Premier Leagues in Australia. It was played on 5 October 2019 at Albert Butler Park in Wollongong between Wollongong Wolves and Lions FC. Wollongong won the match 4–3 to secure their first championship in the National Premier Leagues.

Route to the final

Match

Details

Statistics

Source:

Broadcasting
The Grand Final was broadcast live throughout Australia on Facebook Live and YouTube.

See also
 2019 National Premier Leagues

References

External links
 Official NPL Website

2010s in New South Wales
September 2019 sports events in Australia
Soccer in Wollongong
2018 in Australian soccer
Grand finals